Zhu Xueqin (born 1952) is a Shanghai-based Chinese historian and public intellectual. He is a major exponent of contemporary Chinese liberalism.

Background 
Born in Shanghai, Zhu was shaped in his eventual outlook by China's Cultural Revolution, when he was sent to rural Lankao County, Henan as a "sent-down youth" in 1970. In 1972, he was transferred to factory work.

After earning an MA in history in 1985 from Shaanxi Normal University, from 1985 to 1991 Zhu taught in the Air Force Politics Institute. In 1992, he graduated from Fudan University with a doctorate in history. Since 1991, he has been a Professor in the Department of History, Academy of Letters, Shanghai University.

He wrote an article entitled "1998: The Discourse of Liberalism," which spoke of a "resurfacing" of liberal thought and was published in the widely circulated Southern Weekly.

He has participated in many public activities, such as circular letter campaigns, in support of human rights, freedom of speech, and political reform.

An interview with him entitled "For a Chinese Liberalism" is published in the book One China, Many Paths.

Bibliography

Zhongguoyu ouzhou wenhua jiaoliu zhi [Annals of Sino-European Cultural Exchange] (中国与欧洲文化交流志)

References

See also
Gu Zhun

1952 births
Living people
People's Republic of China historians
Historians from Shanghai
Fudan University alumni
Academic staff of Shanghai University
Liberalism in China
21st-century Chinese historians